Esmir Džafić-Čaja (born 7 October 1967) is a Bosnian retired football player. He runs a football school in Visoko.

Club career
He played for Bosna Visoko, when surprisingly being selected for the national team in 1995.

International career
Džafić made one international appearance, in Bosnia and Herzegovina's first ever official international game, a November 1995 friendly match away against Albania.

References

1967 births
Living people
Association football midfielders
Bosnia and Herzegovina footballers
Bosnia and Herzegovina international footballers
NK Bosna Visoko players
Premier League of Bosnia and Herzegovina players